Fernand Iveton (his surname is sometimes erroneously rendered as "Yveton"; 12 January 1926, Algiers – 11 February 1957) was the only pied noir among the 198 supporters of the FLN who were executed (as opposed to being killed in battle) during the Algerian War. 

Iveton was born in 1926 in Algiers to a Spanish mother and a French father. The father was a member of the Algerian Communist Party (PCA) which the younger Iveton also joined, at the age of sixteen. When the PCA and the FLN signed an agreement in 1956, Iveton, who was a member of the Communist Combattants de la Libération joined the FLN as an individual member.

In November 1956,
Iveton, who worked as a turner at the Algerian Gas Company, was given the task of planting a bomb at the Hamma power station. In order not to kill anybody, he decided both to place the bomb in his locker and to set the timer so that the bomb would explode when the workplace would be empty. However, because of his political record, Iveton was closely watched and the bomb was found before it could explode.

Iveton was arrested, tortured, and sentenced to death after a one-day trial. A group of lawyers attempted to get President René Coty to commute the sentence, noting the fact that nobody had been killed or injured, or would have been killed or injured if the bomb had exploded. They failed, because of the press campaign that had been mounted against Iveton. François Mitterrand, Minister of Justice in the Socialist led Government was in favor of the  execution of Iveton.

He was guillotined in the yard of Barberousse prison in Algiers on 11 February 1957.

A short time later, his accomplices, Jacqueline and Abdelkader Guerroudj, were tried. He was a political officer who liaised between the Combattants de la Libération and the FLN, while she was a teacher, originally from Rouen in France. She had been given the task of handing the bomb materials to Iveton; on being given the assurance that no lives would be lost, she did so.
The Guerroudjs were condemned to death but never executed, partly due to a campaign conducted by Simone de Beauvoir.

References 

Sources
 The Iveton Affair
 Jean-Luc Einaudi, Pour l'exemple, l'affaire Fernand Iveton, éditions L’Harmattan, Paris, 1986 

1926 births
1957 deaths
French communists
People from Algiers
People of the Algerian War
People executed by the French Fourth Republic
People executed by France by decapitation
Saboteurs
French torture victims